Ernie Anastos (born July 12, 1943) is a New York Emmy award winning television news anchor and talk show host on WABC (770 AM) with Positively Ernie focusing on uplifting stories and interviews. He is also a children’s author and host of his own nationally syndicated TV show, Positively America. He has anchored the evening news at three flagship network stations in New York; ABC 7, CBS 2 and FOX 5. In 2017, New York City Mayor Bill de Blasio honored Anastos by designating every March 21 to be Ernie Anastos Day.

Anastos is a Hall of Fame Broadcaster and has received more than 30 Emmy awards and nominations, including "Best Newscast in New York" and the Edward R. Murrow Award for broadcast excellence. The New York Times recently described him as "the ubiquitous anchorman." He is an author of career and educational books for young readers. Anastos also is distinguished for being the United States' first Greek-American news anchorman.

Career
Ernie Anastos has been a television news anchor at WABC-TV, WCBS-TV and WNYW-TV in New York. He has covered stories including 9/11 World Trade Center attacks and the 2020 global pandemic. In 2004 from Cuba, he reported on Fidel Castro’s revolutionary reign and has interviewed other noted world leaders including; Presidents Jimmy Carter, George H.W. Bush and Bill Clinton, also Soviet President Mikhail Gorbachev and South African bishop Desmond Tutu.

He has had broadcast ownership of FM and AM radio stations in New York State and New England. He is also the CEO of his own television production company creating entertainment programming. He launched an Internet youth channel and has also published newspapers and magazines. He has performed on-camera roles as himself in Hollywood motion pictures such as the Independence Day, Summer of Sam, Run All Night and The Yards.

After graduating from Northeastern University with BA degree in Sociology, Anastos worked as a newsman at WRKO and WROR in Boston. In 1976, Anastos moved to television, becoming an anchor at WPRI-TV in Providence. In June 1978, WABC-TV in New York hired Anastos and he became anchor of the 11:00 pm Eyewitness News broadcast in November. He anchored the 11pm broadcast until 1983. Anastos also added the anchor duties for the 5 p.m. newscast WABC-TV.

For a brief period, Anastos was taken off the 5 pm and 11 pm newscasts. During that period, and up until the program was cancelled in 1984, Anastos anchored a 4:30 pm broadcast called Eyewitness Extra. Anastos again became the anchor of the early evening and late newscasts on WABC-TV. He continued to work at 5 pm until 1986, after which he continued to anchor at 11 pm.

In May 1989, Anastos announced that he was leaving WABC after eleven years. The next month, he took over as WCBS-TV’s lead anchor and also the 11 pm anchor role.

From 1995-2000, Anastos became involved in radio and TV broadcast ownership while also anchoring and hosting various assignments including, WWOR-TV and Lifetime's Our Home.

In 2001, he returned to WCBS-TV as the lead anchor at 5pm, 6pm and 11pm. He covered The World Trade Center attacks on 9/11.

In 2005, he signed a five-year, $10 million contact with WNYW-TV. At channel 5, he appeared for the news at 5 and 10pm. At that time, Anastos took over the 6pm news anchor role on WNYW-TV in 2012 with a newly revamped format to include more live interview segments and positive news stories.

In June 2019, Anastos decided to relinquish his anchoring duties at the WNYW-TV to enroll at Harvard Business School to study a curriculum of leadership and management courses. On-air tributes video was prepared by Fox 5. Anastos is also president of Ernie Anastos World Television, Inc. which has co-produced "New York Star of the Day", "Ernie Anastos in New York" and "Positively Ernie", which all appeared on WNYW-TV in New York.

Awards
He has received 30 Emmy Awards and nominations, including the Emmy Lifetime Award and Edward R. Murrow Award for excellence in writing.

He has been profiled in the International Who’s Who of Intellectuals. A Phi Kappa Phi honouree, he graduated with a Bachelor of Arts degree from Northeastern University in Boston, where he is a member of the university board. He has completed additional studies at Harvard Business School and holds honorary doctorate degrees from Marist College, Sacred Heart University and New York Institute of Technology. In May 2008, he was also awarded an honorary doctorate degree from Manhattanville College.

On March 21, 2017, Ernie was honoured by New York City Mayor Bill de Blasio, to have March 21 named Ernie Anastos Day in New York City. Other distinguished awards include; Ellis Island Medal of Honor, New Yorker of the Year Manhattan Chamber of Commerce, and a National Father of the Year Award.

Radio ownership
A Saratoga Springs, New York-based radio station WJKE. The partnership, known as the Anastos Media Group, soon bought several other stations in the Capital District of New York State and later entered the eastern New England media market. The daily operations of the group were handled in part by Anastos' daughter Nina. Effective September 7, 2012, the stations—WABY, WQAR, WUAM and its translator W291BY, and WVKZ—were sold to Empire Broadcasting Corporation for $1.2 million.

See also
 New Yorkers in journalism

References

External links 
 

Ernie Anastos on MyFoxNY

1943 births
Living people
American people of Greek descent
American reporters and correspondents
American television journalists
Television anchors from New York City
New York (state) television reporters
Northeastern University alumni
New York Institute of Technology faculty
People from Armonk, New York
American male journalists
People from Nashua, New Hampshire